Marleve Mario Mainaky (born 26 March 1972) is a former Indonesian badminton player who play in the singles event. He was part of the Indonesia men's team that won the Thomas Cup in 1998, 2000, and 2002. Mainaky had collected a silver and three bronzes at the Asian Championships. He competed at the 2000 Summer Olympics in Sydney, Australia, reaching into the quarterfinals. He was the men's singles bronze medalist at the 2001 Southeast Asian Games, also helped the men's team won the silver medal at that event, and 2002 Asian Games. After retired from the international tournament, he started his career as a badminton coach. Marleve Mainaky was the fifth of seven siblings of Jantje Rudolf Mainaky and Venna Hauvelman. Five of the siblings were also professional badminton player.

Achievements

Asian Championships 
Men's singles

Southeast Asian Games 
Men's singles

IBF World Grand Prix
The World Badminton Grand Prix sanctioned by International Badminton Federation (IBF) since 1983.

Men's singles

IBF International
Men's singles

References

External links
 
 

1972 births
Living people
People from Ternate
Sportspeople from North Maluku
Indonesian male badminton players
Badminton players at the 2000 Summer Olympics
Olympic badminton players of Indonesia
Badminton players at the 2002 Asian Games
Asian Games silver medalists for Indonesia
Asian Games medalists in badminton
Medalists at the 2002 Asian Games
Competitors at the 2001 Southeast Asian Games
Southeast Asian Games silver medalists for Indonesia
Southeast Asian Games bronze medalists for Indonesia
Southeast Asian Games medalists in badminton
Badminton coaches
21st-century Indonesian people